Drymonia is a genus of moths of the family Notodontidae erected by Jacob Hübner in 1819. It consists of the following species:
 Drymonia dodonaea (Denis & Schiffermüller, 1775)
 Drymonia dodonides (Staudinger, 1887)
 Drymonia obliterata (Esper, 1785)
 Drymonia querna (Denis & Schiffermüller, 1775)
 Drymonia ruficornis (Hufnagel, 1766)
 Drymonia velitaris (Hufnagel, 1766)

References

Notodontidae
Taxa named by Jacob Hübner